Mark Fuller (born 24 April 1985, in Norwich) is an English professional squash player. As of February 2018, he was ranked number 145 in the world.

References

1985 births
Living people
English male squash players